Anwar al-Khatib (Arabic: أنور الخطيب | b. 1910 – d. November 14, 1970) was a Lebanese Sunni Muslim lawyer, politician and former cabinet minister.

Early life and education
Anwar al-Khatib was born in 1910 at the town of Chehim, the Capital of the Iqlim al-Kharrub coastal enclave, in the Chouf District. He was the son of the Sunni member of parliament (MP) Ahmad al-Khatib, who was elected to the Lebanese Parliament in 1937, during the French Mandate for Syria and the Lebanon.

Al-Khatib graduated from St. Joseph University. He became a prominent lawyer and taught at the Lebanese University. He wrote articles for many Lebanese publications, in particular in al-Hurriah.

Career

Political activism
Politically he was an ally of the Druze Za'im (Political boss) Kamal Jumblatt. Al-Khatib contested every parliamentary election between 1951 and 1968 and was defeated only twice. His constituency was the Chouf District.

Cabinet minister
In 1968 he was appointed Minister of Water and Electricity.

Death
Anwar al-Khatib died on November 14, 1970 at the age of 60. After his death, his son Zahir al-Khatib won his seat in the 1971 Chouf parliamentary by-election.

See also

Kamal Jumblatt
Toilers League
Progressive Socialist Party
Mountain War (Lebanon)
Lebanese Civil War

References

External links
Anwar El-Khatib (1910-1970)-A sorely missed jurist.

1970 deaths
Lebanese politicians
Lebanese Sunni Muslims
Saint Joseph University alumni
1910 births